Pesi Shroff (b. 1965) is a former Indian champion jockey. He has ridden 5614 races and won 1,751 of them including 106 classic races and 29 Derbys. Born to a Parsi family, he began his career at 16 years old when he was licensed to ride by the Royal Western India Turf Club in Mumbai in the 1981. He won his first race on My Squaw.

Pesi had a long association with Indian liquor baron Vijay Mallya having been a retainer for him for several years. Apart from Mallya, he has also ridden for leading owners of the Indian turf like M.A.M. Ramaswamy, Deepak Khaitan, and Khushroo Dhunjibhoy
.

To date, he is the only jockey to have piloted eight Derby winners at the Mahalaxmi Racecourse, Mumbai and has ridden a classic winner in each of the five major racing centres of India.

On 31 October 2004, he retired from the profession to become a trainer.

Pesi is married to childhood sweetheart Tina (sister of Karl Umrigar) with whom they have had two children, Yohann and Anya. He also likes to play golf and is a cricket fan.

Career wins as a Jockey

References

1965 births
Living people
Indian jockeys
Parsi people from Mumbai
Sportspeople from Mumbai